Gåije is a village in Jämtland, in Åre Municipality, Jämtland County, Sweden. It has about 40 inhabitants. In October 2012, Gåije won the Swedish Postcode Lottery, creating millionaires in 7 of the town's 15 households.

References

Populated places in Åre Municipality
Jämtland